Boothferry Park Halt railway station opened on 6 January 1951 on an embankment of the former Hull and Barnsley Railway to serve the Boothferry Park football stadium which had opened in Hull, East Riding of Yorkshire in August 1946. 

The station was first used for a match against Everton when six trains ran the football service between Paragon Station, Hull's Paragon railway station and Boothferry Park. The station closed in 1986 for safety reasons.

It was removed in October 2007 by Network Rail during engineering work.

References

Disused railway stations in Kingston upon Hull
Railway stations opened by British Rail
Railway stations in Great Britain opened in 1951
Railway stations in Great Britain closed in 1986